Burston may refer to:
Burston, Buckinghamshire
Burston, Devon, a United Kingdom location
Burston, Norfolk
Burston railway station
Burston, Staffordshire, a place in Staffordshire
Burston and Shimpling, Norfolk
Burston, England, fictional location of two fictional universities: Burston Central University and the University of Burston,

People with the surname
Janet Burston (1935–1998), actress
Matt Burston (born 1982), basketball player
Paul Burston (born 1965), journalist
Samuel Burston (1888–1960), soldier and physician